The 1968 United States presidential election in Mississippi was held on November 5, 1968. Mississippi voters chose seven electors, or representatives to the Electoral College, who voted for President and Vice-President.

Background
During the 1960s, the Civil Rights Movement dictated Mississippi's politics, with effectively the entire white population vehemently opposed to federal policies of racial desegregation and black voting rights. In 1960, the state had been narrowly captured by a slate of unpledged Democratic electors but in 1964 universal white opposition to the Civil Rights Act and "War on Poverty" and zero or negligible black voter registration meant that white Mississippians – apart from a small number in the northeastern red clay hills who feared loss of public works – turned almost unanimously to Republican Barry Goldwater. Goldwater's support for "constitutional government and local self-rule" meant that the absence from the ballot of "states' rights" parties was unimportant. The Arizona Senator was one of only six Republicans to vote against the Civil Rights Act, and Goldwater's staunchly conservative policies caused the small Mississippi electorate to almost unanimously support him over the "big government" Johnson.

Following the Voting Rights Act, Federal examiners registered Mississippi blacks as voters in large numbers: African American registration rose from under seven percent to over fifty-nine percent between mid-1965 and 1968. Extreme anger ensued among white Mississippians, because black voting in significant numbers would threaten the entire social fabric of the Black Belt and was even feared by the few upcountry whites who had stayed loyal to Johnson as potentially causing social breakdown. The anger of Mississippi's whites was seen in the 1967 Democratic gubernatorial primary when both Black Belt whites and their traditional foes in the upcountry supported conservative John Bell Williams against William Winter whom it was believed was favored by the newly registered blacks – although it remained political suicide to openly court black support.

In addition, the Twenty-Fourth Amendment and resultant abolition of Mississippi's rigorous poll tax requirements for voting had allowed large increases in white, as well as black, voter registration, with some of these drives done by white supremacist groups like the Ku Klux Klan. Consequently, when segregationist Alabama Governor George Wallace announced in early 1968 that he would mount a third-party candidacy for the Presidency, he had a powerful base in his native Deep South. Meanwhile, by the 1966 midterms, the Republican Party, under new RNC Chairman Ray C. Bliss, had of necessity moved away from the strident conservatism of Goldwater.

Given Wallace's firmly established reputation as a segregationist, it was inevitable that he would be endorsed by Mississippi's established Democratic Party leadership, and this happened in September. William Winter, the losing candidate for Governor the previous year, did support Democratic nominee and sitting Vice-President Hubert Humphrey, but knew that it would be too risky to actively campaign for him.

Vote
By August, there was virtual unanimity that Wallace would carry Mississippi by a large margin, as apart from a small number of wealthy urban communities, he had captured a virtual monopoly of the state's white electorate, including the small minority who had backed Johnson. Wallace was the only candidate to do any campaigning: Nixon did not campaign in the state at all, and won more than twenty percent of the vote in just four of the state's 82 counties. This was the second presidential election which Richard Nixon came in third place in Mississippi. Humphrey improved upon the support gained by Johnson, but this was entirely due to the huge increases in black voter registration – exit polls suggest the national Democratic nominee received less than 5 percent of the white vote. In fact, so marked was the reversal of voting patterns from the previous five presidential elections that Humphrey did worst in the counties where Johnson, John F. Kennedy, Adlai Stevenson and Harry S. Truman had run best.

With 63.46% of the popular vote, Mississippi would prove to be Wallace's second strongest state in the 1968 election after neighboring Alabama.

, this is the last election in which the following counties did not vote for the Republican presidential candidate: Forrest, Lowndes, Lamar, Lauderdale, Lincoln, Newton, Rankin, Scott, Simpson, Harrison, Jackson, Choctaw, Jones, and Smith. It is also the last election in which the Republican nominee won the presidency without carrying Mississippi.

Results

Results by county

Notes

References

1968
Mississippi
1968 Mississippi elections